George Ewing may refer to:

 Bob Ewing (George Lemuel Ewing, 1873–1947), Major League Baseball pitcher
 George Clinton Ewing (1810–1888), American politician and founding figure of Holyoke, Massachusetts
 George Ewing (cricketer) (1851–1930), New Zealand cricketer
 George Edwin Ewing (1828–1884), Scottish sculptor
 George Washington Ewing (1808–1888), Confederate politician during the American Civil War